Jung Seol-bin, formerly Jung Hae-in (born 6 January 1990), is a South Korean footballer who plays as a forward for Hyundai Steel Red Angels and the South Korea national team.

Career statistics

International

Honours

Club
Incheon Hyundai Steel Red Angels
 WK League: 2013, 2014, 2015, 2016, 2017, 2018, 2019, 2020, 2021, 2022

International
South Korea
 Asian Games Bronze medal: 2014

References

External links

1990 births
Living people
South Korean women's footballers
Women's association football forwards
South Korea women's under-20 international footballers
South Korea women's international footballers
2015 FIFA Women's World Cup players
Incheon Hyundai Steel Red Angels WFC players
WK League players
Asian Games medalists in football
Footballers at the 2006 Asian Games
Footballers at the 2014 Asian Games
Asian Games bronze medalists for South Korea
Medalists at the 2014 Asian Games
2019 FIFA Women's World Cup players